The Lovely Bones is a 2018 play based on the 2002 novel of the same name by Alice Sebold, adapted for the stage by Bryony Lavery.

Production 
The production is directed by Melly Still, designed by Ana Inés Jabares-Pita with lighting design by Matt Haskins, sound design by Helen Skiera and movement design by Mike Ashcroft.

The production made its world premiere at the Royal & Derngate in Northampton on 1 September 2018 running until 22 September, before touring to Everyman Liverpool (25 September to 6 October), Northern Stage (9 to 20 October), Birmingham Repertory Theatre (30 October to 10 November) and New Wolsey Theatre (13 to 17 November).

Following its 2018 tour, the production returned to the Birmingham Repertory Theatre from 10 September (previews from 6 September) until 21 September 2019 before embarking on another UK tour to Theatre Royal Nottingham, Exeter Northcott Theatre, Norwich Theatre Royal, The Lowry Salford, Rose Theatre Kingston, Hackney Empire, Cambridge Arts Theatre, Oxford Playhouse, Yvonne Arnaud Theatre, Guildford and Chichester Festival Theatre.

Cast and characters

See also
 The Lovely Bones, 2009 film

References 

2018 plays
Plays based on novels
Plays set in Pennsylvania